This article is a list of Chinese philosophers.

Ancient philosophers

Confucianism 
 Confucius, arguably the most influential Chinese philosopher ever.
 Dong Zhongshu, integrated Yin Yang cosmology into a Confucian ethical framework.
 Gaozi
 Mencius, idealist who proposed mankind is innately benevolent.
 Wang Fu, endorsed the Confucian model of government.
 Wang Mang, emperor who sought to create a harmonious society, yet chaos resulted.
 Xunzi, broke from Mencius' view, instead arguing that morality is extrinsic.
 Yan Hui, the favorite disciple of Confucius and one of the most revered figures of Confucianism. 
 Zengzi
 Zheng Xuan
 Zisi
 Zhu Xi
 List of Confucianists

Taoism 
 Ge Hong
 Laozi (Lao Tzŭ), illusive founder of Taoism and author of the Tao te Ching (Book of the Way).
 Lie Yukou, said to be the author of the Daoist book Liezi
 Yang Xiong
 Zhang Daoling
 Zhang Jue
 Zhuangzi (Chuang Tzŭ), mystical and relativistic skeptic.
 List of Taoists

Chinese School of Naturalists and Naturalism 
 Zou Yan, combined the theories of Yin-Yang and The Five Elements.

Mohism 
 Mozi (Mo Tzŭ), utilitarian and founder of the Mohist school.
 Lu Ban

Legalism 
 Guan Zhong, whose reforms made him disparagingly identified as Legalist, but actual philosophy did not develop until hundred years later.
 Chao Cuo
 Han Feizi, synthesizer of Legalist theories.
 Li Kui
 Li Si
 Shang Yang
 Shen Buhai
 Shen Dao
 Zi Chan

Yangism 
 Yang Zhu

The Logicians 
 Deng Xi
 Hui Shi, relativistic Logician who influenced Zhuangzi.
 Gongsun Long, logician who was known for his paradoxes.

The Agrarians 
 Xu Xing

School of Diplomacy 
 Guiguzi
 Su Qin
 Zhang Yi
 Yue Yi
 Li Yiji

School of Military 
 Sun Tzu
 Sun Bin

Imperial era philosophers

Xuanxue
 Guo Xiang
 Wang Bi, Three Kingdoms philosopher
 Seven Sages of the Bamboo Grove
Ruan Ji 
Ji Kang 
Shan Tao 
Liu Ling 
Ruan Xian 
Xiang Xiu

Zen
 Huineng, 6th Buddhist patriarch of the Chan (Zen) School in China, he established the concept of "no mind".
 Linji Yixuan (Lin-chi), founder of the Linji school of Chan (Zen) Buddhism in China, a branch of which is the Rinzai school in Japan.
 Zhaozhou, famous chan (Zen) master during the 8th century, noted for his wisdom. Became known for his subtle teaching methods and his use of gongans.
 Jizang
 Sengzhao
 Yi Xing
 Zhi Dun
 Xuanzang
 Huiyuan

Neo-Confucianism
 Zhou Dunyi, argued for the inseparability of metaphysics and ethics.
 Cheng Yi, made enemies with other philosophers, resulting in his works being banned.
 Cheng Hao, brother to Cheng Yi.
 Zhu Xi (Chu Hsi), rationalist and leading figure of the School of Principle.
 Chen Hongmou, argued for racial and sexual equality in the place of education.
 Wang Fuzhi, believed Confucius' teachings had become distorted, so wrote his own commentaires.
 Wang Yangming, idealist and leading figure of the School of Mind.
 Li Zhi, preached a form of moral relativism.
 Qian Dehong, further developed The Yangming School of Mind.
 Xu Ai, ardent follower of Wang Yangming.
 Huang Zongxi, one of the first Neo-Confucians to stress the need for constitutional law.
 Zhan Ruoshui, lifelong friend to Wang Yangming.
 Han Yu, precursor to Neo-Confucianism, essayist, and poet.
 Lu Jiuyuan, saw moral conduct as a consequence of intuitive insights into the essence of reality.
 Shao Yong, considered one of the most scholarly men of the time.
 Su Shi, accomplished Song Dynasty writer.
 Ye Shi, stressed practical learning and applying Confucian doctrine to real world problems.
 Zhang Zai, everything is composed of qi, and that fact explains everything.
 Lai Zhide, created the Taijitu.
 Li Ao
 Liu Zongzhou – considered the last master of Song-Ming Neo-Confucianism.

Islamic-Confucianism
 Wang Daiyu
 Liu Zhi
 Ma Zhu

Kaozheng Evidential Research
 Wang Fuzhi 
 Gu Yanwu 
 Yan Yuan  
 Dai Zhen 
 Duan Yucai 
 Ji Xiaolan 
 Zhang Xuecheng 
 Ruan Yuan 
 Kang Youwei 
 Tan Sitong
 Hong Liangji

Philosophers that cannot be easily categorised
 Pan Pingge, criticised Neo-Confucianism, instead emphasized the search for truth in daily living.
 Dai Zhen, made two arguments against Neo-Confucianism.
 Fan Zhen, denied the ideas of reincarnation and body-soul dualism.
 Huan Tan
 Wang Chong
 Ma Rong
 Shen Kuo
 Ximen Bao

Modern philosophers
 Feng Youlan (Fung Yu-Lan), rationalist who integrated Neo-Confucian, Taoist, and Western metaphysics.
 Jin Yuelin, logical positivist and logician.
 Tu Weiming, ethicist.
 Xiong Shili
 Mou Zongsan
 Tang Junyi
 Xu Fuguan
 Zhang Dongsun
 Carsun Chang (Zhang Junmai)
 Zhou Guoping
 Tsang Lap Chuen (曾立存)

Chinese Marxist Philosophy
 Mao Zedong
 Deng Xiaoping
 Wang Ruoshui
 Li Da
 Ai Siqi
 Chen Duxiu
 Qu Qiubai
Xi Jinping
 Yang Xianzhen
 Yang Rongguo
 Zhang Shiying

Chinese

Philosophers